In mathematics, an index set is a set whose members label (or index) members of another set. For instance, if the elements of a set  may be indexed or labeled by means of the elements of a set , then  is an index set.

Examples

Any countably infinite set can be (injectively) indexed by the set of natural numbers .

Other uses
In computational complexity theory and cryptography, an index set is a set for which there exists an algorithm  that can sample the set efficiently; e.g., on input ,  can efficiently select a poly(n)-bit long element from the set.

See also
 Friendly-index set
 Indexed family

References

Mathematical notation
Basic concepts in set theory